A debt limit or debt ceiling is a legislative mechanism restricting the total amount that a country can borrow or how much debt it can be permitted to take on. Several countries have debt limitation restrictions.

Description 
A debt limit is a legislative mechanism restricting the total amount that a country can borrow or how much debt it can be permitted to take on. It is usually set as percentage of GDP, but in a few cases as an absolute amount (for example, $200 billion).

Use 
Several countries have debt limitation laws in place.

Only Denmark and the United States have a debt ceiling that is set at an absolute amount rather than a percentage of GDP. In Denmark, a debt ceiling became necessary in 1993 as a constitutional waiver when day-to-day responsibilities for the public debt was transferred to the National Bank from the Ministry of Finance. It is regarded as a legal formality and consequently a broad consensus in the Danish Parliament has set the limit much higher than the actual debt, making the limit irrelevant (it has been raised once, in 2010 when the debt had reached about two-thirds the limit, the nearest it has ever been, at which point the limit was more than doubled).

Limits as a percentage of GDP are more widespread. Poland has a constitutional limit on public debt, set at 60% of GDP; by law, a budget cannot pass with a breach in place. Examples of other countries that have debt limits as a percentage of GDP are Kenya, Malaysia, Namibia and Pakistan. As part of the Maastricht Treaty, countries that are part of the European Union pledge to keep the public debt below 60% of GDP and the annual deficit below 3%. However, several EU countries have exceeded the limits and a revisal of the rules is planned.

Between 2007 and 2013, Australia had a debt ceiling, which limited how much the Australian government could borrow. The debt ceiling was contained in section 5(1) of the Commonwealth Inscribed Stock Act 1911 until its repeal on 10 December 2013. The statutory limit was created in 2007 by the Rudd Government and set at $75 billion. It was increased in 2009 to $200 billion, $250 billion in 2011 and $300 billion in May 2012. In November 2013, Treasurer Joe Hockey requested Parliament's approval for an increase in the debt limit from $300 billion to $500 billion, saying that the limit will be exhausted by mid-December 2013. With the support of the Australian Greens, the Abbott Government repealed the debt ceiling over the opposition of the Australian Labor Party.

See also
 Debt brake (Germany)
 List of countries by public debt
 Natural borrowing limit

References

Government debt